Linalyl acetate, an organic compound, is the acetate ester of linalool. phytochemical found in many flowers and spice plants.  It is one of the principal components of the essential oils of bergamot and lavender.  It often occurs together with linalool. It is a widely used fragrance.

The chemical tastes similar to how it smells with a pleasant fruity odor reminiscent of bergamot mint oil. It is found in Eau de Cologne mint and is mildly toxic to humans, toxic to fish, and extremely toxic to daphnia. Linalyl acetate is also combustible.

Safety
Linalyl acetate is found safe as a fragrance material under current levels of use.

See also 
 Bergamot essential oil

References

Monoterpenes
Acetate esters